Zié Diabaté (born 2 March 1989) is an Ivorian professional footballer who plays as a defender.

Career
Diabaté began his career with IFER and joined Kabby Sport Bongouanou in 2007. From here, he was transferred in January 2008 to FC Dinamo București.

After four years, in January 2012 he moved to Ligue 1, signing a contract with French club Dijon FCO. He played for Dijon in 14 games in Ligue 1 but could not avoid the club's relegation. In the first half of the 2012–13 season he appeared in only one game for Dijon in Ligue 2 so the club decided to loan him at Belgian club Standard Liège where he would play for the rest of the season. In Belgium he reunited with Mircea Rednic who coached him at FC Dinamo București. After Mircea Rednic left Standard Liège, his contract with the club was not renewed so he went back to Dijon. He later rejoined Rednic who became the new trainer of KAA Gent a few months before, also on loan.

After six months without club, in January 2019, he joined FC Chauray in Championnat National 3, the fifth level in France.

In March 2019, he moved to Persian Gulf Pro League club Foolad.

International
Diabaté was called to the Ivory Coast U-17 team and played in one match at the 2005 FIFA U-17 World Cup.

Career statistics

Honours
Dinamo București
Cupa României: 2011–12

References

External links
 
 

1989 births
Living people
People from Lagunes District
Ivorian footballers
Association football defenders
Ivorian expatriate footballers
Expatriate footballers in Romania
Expatriate footballers in France
Expatriate footballers in Belgium
Expatriate footballers in Iran
Ivorian expatriate sportspeople in Romania
Ivorian expatriate sportspeople in France
Ivorian expatriate sportspeople in Belgium
FC Dinamo București players
Dijon FCO players
Standard Liège players
K.A.A. Gent players
AC Ajaccio players
Nîmes Olympique players
Chamois Niortais F.C. players
FC Chauray players
Foolad FC players
Gazélec Ajaccio players
Liga I players
Liga II players
Ligue 1 players
Ligue 2 players
Championnat National 3 players
Persian Gulf Pro League players
Belgian Pro League players
Ivory Coast youth international footballers